Marsupina nana (dwarf frog shell)  is a species of sea snail, a marine gastropod mollusk in the family Bursidae, the frog Shells.

Description
The Shell size varies between 30 mm and 60 mm

Distribution
This species is distributed in the Gulf of California (along Western Mexico) and in the Pacific Ocean along Peru.

References

External links
 

Bursidae
Gastropods described in 1829